Sheyd Esfahan (also Romanized as Sheyd Eşfahān and Sheid Esfahan; also known as Shīr Eşfahān, Shāh Eşfahān, Shashivan, Shāshiwān, and Shāşofān) is a village in Eqbal-e Gharbi Rural District, in the Central District of Qazvin County, Qazvin Province, Iran. At the 2006 census, its population was 2,695, in 724 families.

References 

Populated places in Qazvin County